Lee Creek is a stream in the U.S. state of West Virginia. It is a tributary of the Ohio River.

Lee Creek was named after David Lee, a pioneer settler.

See also
List of rivers of West Virginia

References

Rivers of Wood County, West Virginia
Rivers of West Virginia